The Badminton Confederation Africa (BCA) (formerly known as Badminton Confederation of Africa) is the governing body of badminton in Africa. It is one of the 5 continental bodies under the flag of the Badminton World Federation (BWF). It now has 42 member countries and 1 associate member.

History
Badminton Confederation of Africa was formed on 31 August 1977 as African Badminton Federation during a meeting in Dar es Salaam, Tanzania. The meeting was attended by delegates from seven national organisations from Ghana, Kenya, Mauritius, Mozambique, Nigeria, Tanzania and Zambia.

Member associations

 Algeria
 Benin
 Botswana
 Burkina Faso
 Burundi
 Cameroon
 Central African Republic
 Congo
 Democratic Republic of Congo
 Djibouti
 Egypt
 Equatorial Guinea
 Eritrea
 Eswatini
 Ethiopia
 Ghana
 Guinea
 Ivory Coast
 Kenya
 Lesotho
 Libya
 Madagascar
 Malawi
 Mauritania
 Mauritius
 Morocco
 Mozambique
 Namibia
 Niger
 Nigeria
 Reunion (associate member)
 Saint Helena
 Seychelle Island
 Sierra Leone
 Somalia
 South Africa
 Sudan
 Tanzania
 Togo
 Tunisia
 Uganda
 Zambia
 Zimbabwe

Presidents

Tournaments
African Badminton Championships
Africa Continental Team Badminton Championships
African Junior Badminton Championships

References

External links
Old website

Badminton organizations
Sports governing bodies in Africa
Badminton World Federation
Badminton in Africa
1977 establishments in Africa